Eileen Mary Theresa Daly (born 1 June 1963) is an English actress, director, film producer, writer, singer, presenter, songwriter and former adult film performer. She is also a contemporary scream queen, having starred in numerous cult horror films and fronts her own band Eileen and Ben.

Early life
Daly was born Eileen Mary Theresa Barnes in Dulwich, London, to Mary (née Daly) and James Barnes Her parents split up when she was three, with her taking her mother's surname. The granddaughter of boxer Nipper Pat Daly, Daly grew up in Hampton Hill, Richmond upon Thames with her mother and younger brother Dominic. She briefly attended drama school before dropping out to pursue private acting lessons instead. Daly left home at a young age and started glamour modelling to earn her living. Based in London she began starring in various films and magazines, and one of her first magazine appearances was in 1979 with future Ben Dover star and creator Simon Lindsay Honey. She appeared in films produced by Color Climax Corporation including "Big Tit Dreamer" and "Lucky Lesbians". Daly has since worked again with Honey on other projects including Loaded TV's sitcom Sexxx and the quiz show Come Again.

Career
Daly lived for a time with video director Tim Pope, who directed promos for The Cure, Siouxsie and the Banshees. She appeared in several videos for the British synthpop duo Soft Cell including their hit "Tainted Love" released by Some Bizzare Records. Tim Pope's videos for the band appeared on the video album Soft Cell's Non-Stop Exotic Video Show, a companion release to their debut album Non-Stop Erotic Cabaret. The collection was originally issued on VHS in 1982 and Betamax and Laser Disk and later re-issued on DVD. She continued to work as a model throughout the 1980s, and in 1991 starred in Linzi Drew's page 3 Striptacular video. In 1996 The People newspaper reported that Daly, who at the time was starring in television advertisements for First Choice Holidays, was a "blue movie queen" who had starred in "kinky videos featuring in bondage and lesbian sex scenes" and said the revelations would come as a shock to the bosses of the holiday booking company. In 2014, Daly stated that "When you are a kid, you are a kid. You get led down the wrong path by not very nice people. If I could have my life again I would say: 'OK, but without that part'."

Throughout this time, Daly also worked as a stripper as well as appearing on several game shows and TV programmes, including roles in the most expensive BBC2 production ever produced at that time, Our Friends in the North. Daly has also taken part in playreadings at the Royal Court Theatre in London.

Daly was one of the first models for the Agent Provocateur range of lingerie, and appeared on television on The Big Breakfast and Kilroy promoting the brand.

In print

Eileen Daly has been a cover model for a range of magazines including Skin Two, Time Out, Bizarre, The Dark Side, The Chronicles, Redeemer, Bite Me and Bloodstone. Many of these magazines have included features on Daly. She also contributed articles and wrote columns for several magazines in the 1990s.

Daly was a regular contributor and columnist for the Dark Side, in which she wrote about low-budget films and interviewed directors, producers (she is herself associate producer on several projects), actors and technicians working in the field. Her column was transferred to DVD and Blu-ray World magazine (itself to cease publication) when the magazine took a break in publication.

Television

Daly has acted in a number of television shows and adverts (Toyota and First Choice among them), and has appeared in programmes such as Snuff Box, Our Friends in the North, EastEnders, Vampyria (documentary), Sex & Shopping, Eurotrash, Beck, The Big Breakfast, Kilroy, Fantasy By Gaslight and The Fast Show. She also had an uncredited role as the "example" human female in the Desmond Morris written and presented series The Human Animal about body language, a co-production of the BBC and the Discovery channel broadcast in 1994.

With the formation of Redemption TV by her then boyfriend Nigel Wingrove, Daly was given the chance to present her own magazine show in which she interviewed musicians, actors, friends and celebrities. Interviewees included the actor and comedian Matt Berry, Chris Adamson, Morrigan Hel and the band Nosferatu. During the show she often took part in short skits or sketches with her interviewees. Daly also filmed several introductions to European horror and cult films, released by Redemption TV, when she appeared in character as the "Dark Angel" in a number of specially shot introductions and promos for the television channel Bravo (which then showed mostly science-fiction and horror).

In late 2012 Daly filmed a sitcom set in a sex shop called Sexxx for the newly launched Loaded TV channel. The series is ongoing and began transmission in late November 2012. Daly is also a regular celebrity contestant on the Loaded TV game show Come Again, often with former co-star Ben Dover

In 2012 Eileen started her own production company called Gipsyphilia Productions. With this company she started her career as a director, writer and producer. One of the first shows she directed was "Daly Does the Dead", a ghost hunting show that takes the team to a haunted hotel in Whitby. Eileen wrote the scripts for all the shows and films, although most of the acting is improvisation. Her band Eileen Daly and The Courtesans provided all the music for the productions. In its first year Gipsyphilia Productions made several magazine and ghost hunting shows: "Mr Crispin at your Cervix", "Daly Does Webcam Girl", "Daly Does Porn Stars", "Daly Does Ghosts" and also had several feature films and shows in pre-production.

Eileen took part in the sixteenth series of Big Brother. She was evicted on 5 June 2015.

Film career

Daly met Nigel Wingrove and together they started up a company called Redemption Films. The company used an image of Daly as its logo and this became part of its marketing strategy with Daly featuring as Redemption's Dark Angel in specially filmed intros for the many foreign and cult films released on the label.

Daly has appeared in films such as All About Anna for Innocent Pictures, Cradle of Fear, Messages,  Kannibal, Sentinels of Darkness, N(eon), Machines of Love & Hate, Razor Blade Smile, Witchcraft X, Evil Calls: The Raven reuniting her with Kannibal director Richard Driscoll, Sacred Flesh  and most recently a series of films with the American actor Joe Zaso culminating in several films with German director and musician Timo Rose. These later films include Darkness Surrounds Roberta, Timo Rose's Beast, Braincell, Unrated and Karl The Butcher Vs Axe. She has acted as associate producer on several of her later films.

Daly has portrayed a vampire in at least four different characters and has also provided voices for animated characters, notably in Monsters of the Id. She has worked with Dave McKean, the artist responsible for the covers of The Sandman comic and the film MirrorMask, on his short film N(eon) which is available on a DVD collection of short films entitled Keanoshow.

Daly starred in the Elisar Cabrera directed Demonsoul as a vampire's human servant/familiar, in the low-budget Alex Chandon directed film Pervirella as the queen of a tribe of Amazon women, in the Elisar Cabrera directed Witchcraft X: Mistress of the Craft as the leader of a coven of vampires, in Razor Blade Smile as Lilith Silver, the protagonist of the film, a frequently fetish-clad hitwoman and adventurer who also happens to be a vampire. Awards for Razor Blade Smile include the Grand Prize at the Gérardmer Film Festival (2000), Honourable Mention at the Sweden Fantastic Film Festival (1998), a "Vampire Oscar" for Daly at Vampyria II in London, and the film won most of the top awards at the first B-Movie Film Festival (1999), including Best B-Film, Director (Jake West), Actress (Eileen Daly), Cinematography and Special Effects. SFX magazine voted the character of Lilith Silver the 30th sexiest vampire of all time. Daly has also starred in the Richard Driscoll directed Kannibal (Headhunter) with American scream queen Linnea Quigley where her character was crucified onscreen for the second time (the first being Sentinels Of Darkness), starred in the third segment of Alex Chandon directed Cradle Of Fear as the girlfriend of a man who has lost a leg and has lost his sex drive (Daly's song "Plastic Surgery" is included in one scene), in Machines of Love and Hate as the mother of a young woman accidentally runs down a hitchhiker, in the Jessica Nilsson directed All About Anna where she played Camilla, a flatmate of Anna – one of several films made to appeal to a female audience featuring hardcore sex scenes and scenes of an adult nature. The film complies with a "Puzzy Power Manifesto" which lays down strict guidelines of what should and should not be included in the film in order that it be tailored for female rather than male sensibilities. Daly has also starred in Darkness Surrounds Roberta as the manager of an escort/model agency three girls from which have been murdered, in Timo Rose's Beast as the stepmother of lead character Alex (Daly also acted as associate producer on the film), in the Richard Driscoll directed Darkness Calls: the Raven (The Legend of Harrow Woods) (originally titled "Alone in the Dark" but changed in order not to clash with the film of the popular videogame) as a psychic who accompanies a group of people into woods that have been cursed and may herself be a serial killer, and in the Kemal Yildirim directed Rose - The Movie a film premiered  at the London Independent Film Festival in 2012 and winner of the prestigious "Van Gogh award" at the Amsterdam film festival 2012, as the matriarch in a nightmare world of criminals, drug dealers, street-fighters and pimps.

Music career

Daly formed the band Jezebel in 1998. They played music described by Daly as "an eclectic mix of rock, Goth and perverse fairy tales". The first album, Forbidden Fruit  was released on 26 March 2004 on the record label Triple Silence, a music label linked to Redemption. A track off the album, entitled "Plastic Surgery" was featured on the Cradle of Fear film soundtrack CD. Another track off the album, retitled You're So Cute, is featured in the film All About Anna, performed onscreen by Daly. Daly released a single entitled "Persuasion" and performed it on Eurotrash on which she was interviewed about her career to date. She worked with producer and musician Steven Severin who had provided music for the film Visions of Ecstasy for Nigel Wingrove.

Daly formed her current band 'Eileen and Ben' with her partner Ben Thirkettle, while her other musical project Jezebel was put on hold. The duo play a combination of what they describe as "gypsy, glam and rock". Their debut single featuring "Webcam Girl" was released in 2007 and followed up with an EP entitled Elfing Around. They have often performed around London and Southern England together with appearances at festivals in Glastonbury, Bram Stoker International Film Festival and in Italy. They released their self-titled debut album one song at a time for digital download throughout 2013 and 2014. In September 2014 they auditioned and progressed as far as bootcamp on The X Factor.

Discography 
 Forbidden Fruit (2004) (with the group Jezebel)
 Webcam Girl / Burnout (Pink Vinyl Single 2007)
 Elfing Around (2009)
 Next Stop Vegas (2015)

Filmography 

Assassins Revenge (2018) .... Elizabeth Bathory
Tearful Surrender (2017) .... Dream Witch (segment "Tearful Surrender")
Sinema (2017) ... Tess Runckle
The Tombs: Rise of the Damned (2016) 
The Curse of the Witches Blood (2016) ... Sarah
Mr Crispin At Your Cervix (2014) TV Show
Daly Does The Dead (2014) TV Show
Daly Does Ghosts (2013) TV Show
Daly Does Webcam Girl (2013) TV Show
Daly Does Porn Stars (2013) TV Show featuring Ben Dover
Life.Love.Regret. (2013) (Short) .... The Woman
Quiet Night Out (2013) (Short) .... Ice Queen (voice)
The Amityville Asylum (2013) .... Sadie Krenwinkel
Come Again (2012–13) Loaded TV Game Show .... Regular Team captain
Sexxx (2012) Loaded TV Sitcom .... Miss Kitty (6 episodes)
Silent Cradle (2012) .... Chloe
Rose-The Movie (2012) .... Yondra
The Turning  (2011) .... Ilsa
The Horror Vault 3  (2010) .... Missing Woman (segment "A Christmas Haunting")
Karl The Butcher Vs Axe  (2010) .... Queen Scarar
Unrated (2010) .... Cassandra
Braincell (2010) .... Nurse Audra
Albion Rising (2009) .... Charlotte Mew
Evil Calls: The Raven (aka 'Alone in the Dark') (2008) .... Victoria
Timo Rose's Beast (2009) .... Lydia
Darkness Surrounds Roberta (2007) .... Eleanor Maynard
Monsters of the Id (V) .... Jetstream Jenny (an animated feature)
Messages (2007) .... Denise
Peekaboo Show (2006) (TV) .... Herself (on her own show)
Snuff Box (2006) (TV) .... Rich Fulcher's date
All About Anna (2005) .... Camilla
Machines of Love and Hate (2003) .... Cynthia Marks
N[eon] (2002) .... The Ghost
Sentinels of Darkness (2002) .... Velislava
Cradle of Fear (2001) .... Natalie
Kannibal''' (2001) .... Tanya SloveigSacred Flesh (2000) .... Repression (but credited as Catechism)Razor Blade Smile (1998) .... Lilith SilverArchangel Thunderbird (1998) .... Miki MansonWitchcraft X: Mistress of the Craft' (1997) .... RavenPervirella (1997) .... Cu-RarePayday (1996) .... DianneOur Friends in the North (1996) (TV) .... DancerRedemption Films (1995) ... The Dark AngelCynthia Payne's House of Cyn (1995)Demonsoul (1995) .... SelenaThe Babysitter (1993) .... The MotherSweet Nothing'' (1990) (TV) .... Stripogram

Notes and references

External links

Eileen's band

Eileen Daly's Production Company

Living people
1963 births
English film actresses
English female models
English television presenters
English television producers
English television writers
English female adult models
English pornographic film actresses
English women singers
People from Dulwich
Big Brother (British TV series) contestants
British women television producers
British women television writers